Luis Maurício Capelache dos Santos (born August 7, 1980 in Santos) is a male water polo player from Brazil, who plays as a goalkeeper. He competed for his native country at the 2007 Pan American Games, where he claimed the silver medal with the Brazil men's national water polo team.

References
 Profile

1980 births
Living people
Brazilian male water polo players
Pan American Games silver medalists for Brazil
Pan American Games medalists in water polo
Water polo players at the 2007 Pan American Games
Medalists at the 2007 Pan American Games
Sportspeople from Santos, São Paulo
21st-century Brazilian people